is a professional Japanese baseball player. He plays pitcher for the Chunichi Dragons.

On 20 October 2017, Shimizu was selected as the 4th draft pick for the Chunichi Dragons at the 2017 NPB Draft and on 20 November signed a provisional contract with a ¥40,000,000 sign-on bonus and a ¥6,000,000 yearly salary.

Shimizu looks up to fellow pros, Kodai Senga and Yasuaki Yamasaki for inspiration.

References

1999 births
Living people
Baseball people from Saitama Prefecture
Japanese baseball players
Nippon Professional Baseball pitchers
Chunichi Dragons players